SBRI may refer to the 

 Center for Global Infectious Disease Research, formerly known as Seattle Biomedical Research Institute 
 Small Business Research Initiative in the United Kingdom